Henry Albert Cattermull (March 1871 – 30 August 1935) was a member of the Queensland Legislative Assembly.

Early life
Cattermull was born at Suffolk, England, the son of Henry Cattermull and his wife Catherine (née Wills). He was a sugar grower and later on, a partner in the Sunnyside Mill at Bundaberg.

On the 13 December 1890 he married Agatha Turner (died 1956) an together they had one son and six daughters. Cattermull died at Bundaberg in August 1931 and was buried in the Bundaberg General Cemetery.

Public life
Cattermull, representing the Country Party, won the seat of Musgrave in the Queensland Assembly at the 1920 Queensland state election. He only held the seat for one term as Musgrave was abolished for the 1923 Queensland state election; he was defeated at that election contesting Bundaberg.

In addition to his time in state parliament he was also a member of the Woongarra Shire Council in 1896-1921 including eighteen of those years as chairman and Cattermull was also an alderman in the Bundaberg City Council.

References

Members of the Queensland Legislative Assembly
1871 births
1935 deaths
National Party of Australia members of the Parliament of Queensland